Savarabad-e Olya (also Romanized as Savārābād-e ‘Olyā; also known as Savārābād) is a village in Nahr-e Mian Rural District, Zalian District, Shazand County, Markazi Province, Iran. At the 2006 census, its population was 30, in 13 families.

References 

Populated places in Shazand County